The men's shot put event at the 1957 World University Games was held at the Stadium Charlety in Paris with the final on 6 September 1957.

Medalists

Results

Final

References

Athletics at the 1957 World University Games
1957